Philotimo (also spelled filotimo) is a Greek noun that has the literal translation of "love of honor". However, philotimo is claimed to be impossible to translate sufficiently as it describes a complex array of virtues.

Ancient uses

The word is used in early writings, sometimes in a bad sense; Plato's Republic uses philotimon (φιλότιμον) ironically: "covetous of honor"; other writers use philotimeomai (φιλοτιμέομαι) in the sense of "lavish upon". However, later uses develop the word in its more noble senses.  By the beginning of the Christian era, the word was firmly a positive and its use in the Bible probably cemented its use in modern Greek culture.

The word philotimon is used extensively in Hellenistic period literature.

Biblical uses
The word appears three times in the text of letters written by the Apostle Paul.  Paul was a fluent Greek speaker and, by his writing, shows he was well educated in Hellene literature.  His letters were originally written in Greek and therefore the choice of the word was deliberate and the sophisticated choice of an educated man.

It is a difficult word to translate into English and is rendered variously depending on the Bible translation.  Valid alternatives include; ambition, endeavour earnestly, aspire, being zealous, strive eagerly, desire very strongly or study.  In each case Paul is conveying a desire to do a good thing and his choice of word gives this honourable pursuit extra emphasis.

In Romans 15:20 he makes it his philotimo (he uses the verb φιλοτιμέομαι, [philotiméome] to preach the good news of the Gospel to people who have not heard it.

In 2nd Corinthians 5:9, he uses it to describe his "labour" in the sense of his life's work and strivings.

In 1st Thessalonians 4:11 he uses it to describe the sort of ambition believers should have to conduct their lives with philotimo: - a life above reproach, well regarded by their community for their kindness.

Modern uses
Philotimo is still used today. In its simplest form, the term means conscientiously honoring one's responsibilities and duties, and not allowing one's honor, dignity, and pride to be sullied.

See also
Giri (Japanese)

References

External links
 Philotimo - The White House
 
 BBC - The Greek word that can't be translated

Greek culture
Greek words and phrases
Virtue
Concepts in ancient Greek ethics